ENTSO may refer to:
European Network of Transmission System Operators for Electricity (ENTSO-E)
European Network of Transmission System Operators for Gas (ENTSO-G)